The heats for the Women's 100 m Backstroke race at the 2009 World Championships took place in the morning and evening of 27 July and the final took place in the evening session of 28 July at the Foro Italico in Rome, Italy.

Records
Prior to this competition, the existing world and competition records were as follows:

The following records were established during the competition:

Heats

Semifinals

Final

External links
Heats Results
Semifinals Results
Finals Results

Backstroke Women's 100 m
2009 in women's swimming